Bat-Mite is a fictional character appearing in American comic books published by DC Comics. Bat-Mite is an imp similar to the Superman villain Mister Mxyzptlk. Depicted as a small, childlike man in an ill-fitting Batman costume, Bat-Mite possesses what appear to be near-infinite magical powers, but he actually uses highly advanced technology from the fifth dimension that cannot be understood by humans' limited three-dimensional views. Unlike Mxyzptlk, Bat-Mite idolizes his superhero target and thus he has visited Batman on various occasions, often setting up strange and ridiculous events so that he could see his hero in action. Bat-Mite is more of a nuisance than a supervillain, and often departs of his own accord upon realizing that he has angered his idol.

Publication history
Bat-Mite made his first appearance in Detective Comics #267 (May 1959) in a story titled "Batman Meets Bat-Mite" written by Bill Finger, with art by Sheldon Moldoff.

Bat-Mite, along with Batwoman, Bat-Girl and Ace the Bat-Hound, retired from the comic in 1964, when editor Julius Schwartz instituted a "New Look" Batman that shed some of the sillier elements in the series.

Fictional character history

Pre-Crisis

Bat-Mite regularly appeared in Batman, Detective Comics, and World's Finest Comics for five years. Bat-Mite and Mr. Mxyzptlk teamed up four times in the pages of World's Finest Comics to plague Superman and Batman together, as well. In 1964, however, when the Batman titles were revamped under new editor Julius Schwartz, Bat-Mite vanished along with other members of the Batman extended family, such as Batwoman, Bat-Girl, and Ace the Bat-Hound. 

After this, only three more Bat-Mite stories were published in the Pre-Crisis DC Universe: two more Bat-Mite/Mr. Mxyzptlk team ups in World's Finest Comics #152 (August 1965) and #169 (September 1967) (which were not edited by Schwartz, but by Mort Weisinger), and "Bat-Mite's New York Adventure" from Detective Comics #482 (February–March 1979), in which the imp visits the DC Comics offices and insists that he be given his own feature in a Batman comic. This story featured protestors with picket signs shouting "We want Bat-Mite!" outside the Tishman Building (where DC's editorial offices were located at the time), and was accompanied by an editorial comment that this story was published specifically to acknowledge the actual requests of fans for this character's revival.

Later Bat-Mite appeared in a one-page story in The Brave and the Bold #200.

Post-Crisis
After the continuity-changing 1985 limited series Crisis on Infinite Earths was published, Bat-Mite was mostly removed from the Batman comics canon. Bat-Mite made an appearance in Batman: Legends of the Dark Knight #38, although he may have been the hallucination of a drug-addled criminal named Bob Overdog. This comic states that Bat-Mite is one of the many admirers of superheroes from another dimension. This version of Bat-Mite later returned in Batman: Mitefall — A Legends of the Dark Mite Special, a one-shot book which was both part of, and a parody of, the Batman storyline Knightfall (with Overdog briefly in the Jean-Paul Valley role). In #6 of the 1999 Batman and Superman: World's Finest miniseries, Mr. Mxyzptlk encounters Bat-Mite, shortly after being mistaken for him by Overdog. While in this story, the Post-Crisis Bat-Mite encounters Batman for the first time, Superman and Batman subsequently concluded that Mxyzptlk had created him, inspired by Overdog's ravings.

Bat-Mite also appeared in the 2000 one-shot Elseworlds comic special World's Funnest, in which he battles Mr. Mxyzptlk, destroying the Pre-Crisis multiverse and the Post-Crisis DC Universe, as well as the Elseworlds of Kingdom Come, Batman: The Dark Knight Returns, and the DC animated universe. As an Elseworlds story itself, World's Funnest has no impact on continuity, as inferred from The Dark Knight Returns and Kingdom Come being introduced to the official DC multiverse as a result of the maxiseries 52.

Apart from World's Funnest, there has been no direct connection between Bat-Mite and Mr. Mxyzptlk. In the Bizarro Comics anthology, Mxyzptlk's native Fifth Dimension seemed to include beings similar to Bat-Mite and Johnny Thunder's Thunderbolt. Neither of these comics are considered canonical; however, in a Justice League/Justice Society of America crossover in Justice League and in Justice Society of America #78–80 it was revealed that both Mxyzptlk and Thunderbolt come from the Fifth Dimension. Letter columns and writer interviews suggest that Bat-Mite comes from there as well, although this has never been shown thus far in the comic stories themselves.

In the post-crisis issue Superman/Batman #25, it was revealed that the Joker had gained Fifth Dimensional powers by maintaining the essence of Mr. Mxyzptlk from the earlier "Emperor Joker" storyline; at the end, Bizarro was able to extract this latent magical essence from the Joker, which manifested in a form recognizable as Bat-Mite.  As such, a Bat-Mite has been fully reestablished into the current continuity as an outgrowth of Mr. Mxyzptlk, incubated within the Joker.

The first Post-Infinite Crisis appearance of Bat-Mite was in Batman #672, written by Grant Morrison. Batman is confronted with Bat-Mite (or "Might") after being shot in the chest and suffering a heart attack. Might, who bears a green insectoid creature on his back, claims to have come from "Space B at the Fivefold Expansion of Zrfff" (at times, Zrfff has been used as the name of Mr. Mxyzptlk's home planet in the Fifth Dimension). Only Batman sees him. As Batman is having an increasingly difficult time keeping his grip on reality during this period, it is possible that Mite is a mental delusion.

In Batman #678, after Batman transforms himself into "the Batman of Zur-En-Arrh", Might reappears on the last page with him, commenting "uh-oh" regarding Batman's increasing delusions. He then counsels the Zur-En-Arrh Batman, a 'back-up' personality manufactured by Bruce himself to keep Batman able to fight in case he was mindwiped, or driven to insanity. Batman #680 reveals that Might is indeed a product of Batman's imagination, representing the last vestiges of Batman's rational mind within the Zur-En-Arrh Batman, although when asked by Batman whether he is an extra-dimensional being or a figment of his imagination, Bat-Mite responds that "the Fifth Dimension is imagination".

In Superman/Batman #52, Bat-Mite appears, having had a bet with Mr. Mxyzptlk similar to that of World's Funnest. This Bat-Mite appears to admire Batman, and Batman addresses him with familiarity.

The New 52
On February 6, 2015, DC Comics announced a Bat-Mite monthly miniseries for release in June 2015. The six-issue miniseries concluded in November.

Powers and abilities
Bat-Mite has powers and skills identical to that of Mister Mxyzptlk (but not his weaknesses), such as the ability to manipulate spacetime. He can access to various bat-weapons like his hero, Batman.

Publications

2015 series
Bat-Mite (2016-02-17): Includes Bat-Mite #1-6, Sneak Peek story from Convergence: Supergirl: Matrix #2.

In other media

Television

Animation

 Bat-Mite appears in The New Adventures of Batman, voiced by Lou Scheimer. This version is a well-meaning magical fan of Batman who tries to help him despite usually complicating matters. One episode featured his home planet of Ergo as well as a villain of Bat-Mite's species named Zarbor.
 An animatronic Bat-Mite briefly appears in the Batman: The Animated Series episode "Deep Freeze", voiced by Pat Fraley.
 Bat-Mite appears in Batman: The Brave and the Bold, voiced by Paul Reubens. This version regularly breaks the fourth wall, reads to Batman his past, present, and future exploits from real world comic books, and makes fun of real-world comic convention fans.
 Bat-Mite appears in Lego DC Comics: Batman Be-Leaguered, voiced again by Paul Reubens.
 A stuffed Bat-Mite toy appears in DC Super Hero Girls.

Live-action

 Bat-Mite is mentioned in the second episode of the DC Extended Universe series Peacemaker, "Best Friends, For Never", when John Economos mentions he would rather be working with Bat-Mite than Peacemaker.

Video games
 Bat-Mite appears in Batman: The Brave and the Bold - The Videogame as a special assist character in the Wii version. He can be summoned and controlled with a running copy of the game's Nintendo DS counterpart to drop anvils, bombs, and power-ups via Wii-DS connectivity.
 Bat-Mite appears as a playable character and game navigator in Lego Batman 3: Beyond Gotham, voiced by Roger Craig Smith.

References

External links
Bat-Mite at Comic Vine

DC Comics aliens
DC Comics deities
DC Comics supervillains
DC Comics superheroes
DC Comics characters who can teleport 
DC Comics characters who use magic
Fictional characters from parallel universes
Fictional characters who can manipulate reality
Fictional higher-dimensional characters
Fictional tricksters
Comics characters introduced in 1959
Characters created by Bill Finger
Characters created by Sheldon Moldoff
Characters created by Bob Kane